Mitar Ćuković (born 6 April 1995) is a Montenegrin footballer who plays for Napredak Kruševac in the Serbian SuperLiga.

Career

Napredak Kruševac
In July 2019, Ćuković joined Serbian SuperLiga club Napredak Kruševac.

Honours
Proleter Novi Sad
Serbian First League: 2017–18

References

External links

1995 births
Living people
People from Herceg Novi
Association football fullbacks
Montenegrin footballers
FK Igalo 1929 players
OFK Petrovac players
FK Lovćen players
FK Proleter Novi Sad players
FK Napredak Kruševac players
Montenegrin First League players
Serbian SuperLiga players
Montenegrin expatriate footballers
Expatriate footballers in Serbia
Montenegrin expatriate sportspeople in Serbia